Bazarek  is a settlement in the administrative district of Gmina Telatyn, within Tomaszów Lubelski County, Lublin Voivodeship, in eastern Poland.

References

Bazarek